Lisa Fischer (born December 1, 1958) is an American singer and songwriter. She found success with her 1991 debut album So Intense, which produced the Grammy Award–winning hit single "How Can I Ease the Pain". She has been a back-up singer for a number of famous artists, including Sting, Luther Vandross, and Tina Turner, and she toured with The Rolling Stones from 1989 to 2015.

Early life
Fischer was born in the Fort Greene neighborhood in the New York City borough of Brooklyn. Fischer's mother gave birth to her at age 16 and had a total of three children by the time she was 19. Fischer has fond memories of singing with her mother (a homemaker), her father (a warehouse worker and security officer), and her two younger brothers. She attended The High School of Music & Art in Manhattan. When Fischer was 14 her father left the family and when Fischer was 17, her mother died.

In an interview with Christian Wikane of PopMatters, Fischer stated she was influenced by Freda Payne, Marvin Gaye and Melba Moore, and others early in her childhood. In the years before launching her solo mainstream career, she noted significant influence from the black LGBT community, particularly in developing a stage image with adventure, quality, and beauty.

Career

1983–1989: Xēna and The Rolling Stones
In 1983, under the stage name "Xēna", Fischer released the b-boy classic "On the Upside". In 1984, a club track she recorded titled "Only Love (Shadows)" was briefly featured in the motion picture Beat Street  and was later released in 1995 as part of the Hot Productions' The Best of Criminal Records compilation. However, Fischer began her music career supporting other artists providing backing vocals for artists including Melba Moore and Billy Ocean. She worked with many other famous singers, both as a session vocalist and sideman. She accompanied Luther Vandross whom she met through the mutual acquaintance of choreographer Bruce Wallace, who asked her to come to his agency for an audition. Fischer then traveled as a backup singer on his tours and sang on his albums until his death, in addition to other famous musicians, including Chaka Khan, Teddy Pendergrass, and Roberta Flack.

Fischer maintained her career as a session singer, and has accompanied The Rolling Stones on tour since 1989. She worked as a backup vocalist during the same period for Luther Vandross for the 22 years prior to his death alongside friend and collaborator Ava Cherry, juggling his concert tours and those of The Rolling Stones, with whom she grew an audience playing the foil to Mick Jagger onstage. During tours with the Rolling Stones, she shares lead vocals on several songs, including "Monkey Man, and "Gimme Shelter", which showcase her vocal talents.

1990–1994: So Intense
Fischer's solo career peaked with the 1991 release of "How Can I Ease the Pain" from her album So Intense, reaching Number One on the R&B charts, and winning a Grammy Award for Best Female R&B Vocal Performance in 1992. The album spawned three Top 20 R&B hits, and peaked at #5 on the Top R&B/Hip-Hop Albums chart and #100 on the Billboard 200 chart. Asked about the inspiration for her album, Fischer replied "I wasn't deep in search of a record deal, it was just one of those things...". In the movie 20 Feet From Stardom, Fischer's Grammy award for her hit single collects dust on a shelf. Fischer said she "just doesn't know what to do with it". Although Fischer earned success with her first album, a follow-up solo studio album was not released because an attempt to create a second album failed due to "energy shifts".

Fischer recorded on various projects including providing lead vocals on the power ballad "Colors of Love" featured on the soundtrack for the film Made in America. Fischer says a contributing factor in her decision to discontinue her solo career following the release of her debut album was her fondness for backing vocalist rather than a solo artist. In a 2013 article, Fischer compared back-up singing to a "tuning fork", and noted she rejected the idea of dissatisfaction and the theory of always aspiring for something more while creating music and supporting other artists. In 1992, Fischer traveled to Japan to perform in the Earth Voice Concert with Lee Ritenour, Phil Perry, Bobby Caldwell, Brenda Russell, James Ingram, Michael McDonald, Anita Baker, and others. During the concert, Fischer sang her 1991 hit "How Can I Ease The Pain", and provided backing vocals for her fellow musicians.

1996: Theatre

In August 1996, Fischer made her theatre debut in the off-Broadway play Born to Sing! chronicling the life and career of the fictional gospel superstar, Doris Winter. The final installment of the Mama, I Want to Sing! trilogy featured Fischer in the starring role of Doris Winter, and followed the character as she assembled a company of fellow singers for a global World Peace and Harmony Tour.

1996–2013: Backup singing

Fischer continued to work on music, doing background vocals and writing songs for other artists, including Anane Vega. Fischer toured with Tina Turner on her Twenty Four Seven Tour. It was the worldwide top-grossing tour of 2000. Lisa was featured in an April 14, 2008 issue of Jet Magazine′s "Where Are They Now?" column. In 2009, Fischer completed touring with Tina Turner on her Tina!: 50th Anniversary Tour, and is featured on Turner's live DVD-CD titled Tina Live. In the performance of Tina!: 50th Anniversary Tour, Fischer and Turner sang "It's Only Rock 'n Roll (But I Like It)" together; after Turner left the stage, Fischer completed the song solo.

Fischer sang on Sting's album If on a Winter's Night... as a backing vocalist. In September 2009, Sting and his band with Fischer performed in Durham Cathedral. The rehearsals as well as the concert are available as a DVD. The behind-the-scenes documentary surrounding the event was produced jointly by the BBC, and was screened on December 29 that year. She appeared at the 2010 CareFusion Newport Jazz Festival in Newport, Rhode Island with jazz trumpeter Chris Botti. She toured with Botti through 2010, including appearing nightly as guest vocalist during the trumpeter's annual holiday engagement at the Blue Note Jazz Club in New York city. She remained a guest artist with Botti's band in 2011, and continued to appear at their 2012 concerts.

In 2012, she joined the Rolling Stones for their 50 & Counting Tour in October 2012, and toured globally with the band until July 2013. The band announced a follow-up tour 14 On Fire scheduled to start in February, including dates in the Middle East, Asia, and Europe in summer 2014, and Australia in fall 2014.

In 2013, Fischer joined the rock band Nine Inch Nails as a backing vocalist for their Tension 2013 tour.

2013–2014: 20 Feet from Stardom
 
Fischer is one of the artists featured in the Oscar-winning documentary film 20 Feet from Stardom (2013), which premiered at the Sundance Film Festival and was released on June 21, 2013. The documentary highlights back-up singers by archiving the oral histories of artists like Merry Clayton and Darlene Love and their experiences within the American music industry. The film earned the 2015 Grammy Award for Best Music Film, with the award presented to the featured artists as well as the production crew.

In 2014, Fischer re-united with many of the back-up singers in 20 Feet From Stardom including Darlene Love, Merry Clayton, and Judith Hill to sing the national anthem at the 100th Rose Bowl in Pasadena, California.

2014–present: Solo career

In 2014, Fischer began her solo tour accompanied by her band Grand Baton, performing across the United States, Canada, Europe, Asia, Australia, and New Zealand. That same year, a press release announced Fischer would collaborate with performer Billy Childs on a studio project about Laura Nyro. 2015, returning to her solo career, Fischer sold out six consecutive shows at The Jazz Standard in New York City.

In 2015, she, along with her musical director, the composer, arranger, and pianist JC Maillard, collaborated with choreographer Alonzo King to create the music/dance ensemble piece entitled The Propelled Heart for the Alonzo King LINES Ballet. The Propelled Heart premiered at the Yerba Buena Center for the Arts in San Francisco on November 6, 2015. In September 2017, Fischer reprised her role in The Propelled Heart at the Kwai Tsing Theatre in Hong Kong. The program returned to the SF Bay Area's Yerba Buena Center for the Arts in November 2017 in honor of the 35th Anniversary of LINES Ballet.

In addition to her collaboration with King, in 2016, Fischer provided vocal performances on three Grammy nominated projects including Louie Vega Starring...XXVIII with Louie Vega and The Elements of Life; Sing Me Home with Yo-Yo Ma, The Silkroad Ensemble, and Gregory Porter; as well as New York Rhapsody with Lang Lang and Jeffrey Wright. In February 2018, Fischer's vocal performances were featured in the HBO Film presentation Notes From The Field written and produced by playwright Anna Deavere Smith.

Fischer and Grand Baton partnered with The Seattle Symphony for their program Just A Kiss Away in February 2018 in which rock music anthems such as The Rolling Stones' "Gimme Shelter" were re-created orchestrally. The orchestral arrangements were composed by Chris Walden.

Discography

Albums
 So Intense (1991)

Tours

Awards and nominations

Filmography

Theatre

References

External links

 
 
 
 
 
 Lisa Fischer Grammy Awards History

1958 births
American freestyle musicians
American session musicians
Elektra Records artists
Grammy Award winners
Living people
Nine Inch Nails members
Singers with a four-octave vocal range
The High School of Music & Art alumni
American sopranos
African-American women singers
Musicians from Brooklyn
Singers from New York City
20th-century American singers
21st-century American singers
American contemporary R&B singers
American house musicians
20th-century American women singers
21st-century American women singers
American soul singers
People from Fort Greene, Brooklyn
American women in electronic music